Mariel Hadley Hemingway (born November 22, 1961) is an American actress. She began acting at age 14 with a Golden Globe-nominated breakout role in Lipstick (1976), and she received Academy and BAFTA Award nominations for her performance in Woody Allen's Manhattan (1979).

She is also known for her leading roles in Personal Best (1982), Star 80 (1983), and the TV series Civil Wars for which she received a Golden Globe nomination. Amid mental health struggles, Hemingway's career dwindled in the 1990s. She has starred in and co-produced videos about yoga and holistic living. She published a yoga memoir, Finding My Balance, in 2002, and a more general memoir, Out Came the Sun, in 2015.

Early life
Hemingway was born in Mill Valley, California, the third daughter of Byra Louise (née Whittlesey) and Jack Hemingway, a writer. Her sisters are Joan "Muffet" and Margot "Margaux", the latter of whom became a model and actress.

Her paternal grandparents were Hadley Richardson and Nobel Prize-winning novelist Ernest Hemingway, who died by suicide four months before she was born. She was named after the Cuban port of Mariel—her father and grandfather visited the village regularly to go fishing. Her middle name was her paternal grandmother's. Hemingway grew up primarily in Ketchum, Idaho, where her father lived, and where Ernest had spent time as a sportsman and writer.

Career in film
Hemingway's first role was with her real-life sister Margaux (also in her debut role) in the film Lipstick (1976), in which they played sisters. She received notice for her acting and was nominated as "Best Newcomer" for the Golden Globe Award that year. Her highest-profile role was in Woody Allen's Manhattan (1979), a romantic comedy in which she plays Tracy, a high school student and Allen's lover. She was nominated for an Academy Award for Best Supporting Actress.

In Personal Best (1982), she played a bisexual track-and-field athlete in a film noted for its same-sex love scenes. In connection with Personal Best, she appeared in a nude pictorial in the April 1982 issue of Playboy and was on the cover.

She starred as Dorothy Stratten in Star 80 (1983), a film about the Playboy model's life and murder. Reports circulated for years that Hemingway had had her breasts enlarged to play the role of Stratten, but during a 2007 appearance on the late-night talk and variety show, Fashionably Late with Stacy London, she said she had had the surgery before Star 80. Her breast implants were removed years later after they had ruptured.

She was featured in Superman IV: The Quest for Peace (1987) as Lacy Warfield. Subsequently released additional footage showed an expansion of her role. She also co-starred in the 1991–93 ABC series Civil Wars. She was cast as the female lead in Darren Star's CBS drama Central Park West for the 1995–96 season; however, the show fared poorly with both critics and viewers, and after 13 episodes Hemingway was told that the show wanted her to accept a deep pay cut and demotion to recurring character status. She quit the series, which only lasted eight more episodes before being cancelled. In 1996, she had a leading role in the British TV movie September, playing the wife of Michael York.

She has played a lesbian or bisexual woman in several films and television shows, including Personal Best, The Sex Monster, In Her Line of Fire, and episodes of the TV series Roseanne ("Don't Ask, Don't Tell" and "December Bride") and Crossing Jordan. Hemingway is heterosexual, but has said she formed a "big connection with the LGBT community" after Personal Best and enjoys taking roles in "cutting-edge" productions.

She is currently the host of Spiritual Cinema, a monthly television show dedicated to spiritual films. She has begun hosting a series of yoga practice videos Yoga Now, with guru Rodney Yee.

Hemingway worked on the documentary film Running from Crazy, directed by Barbara Kopple and produced by the Oprah Winfrey Network chronicling the Hemingway family's history of suicide, substance abuse and mental illness, shown at the Sundance Film Festival in 2013. In October 2013, Hemingway received a humanitarian award from the San Diego Film Festival for her role in the documentary.

Personal life
Hemingway married Stephen Crisman in 1984. They have two daughters: Dree Hemingway and Langley Fox. They separated in 2008 and divorced the following year.

In 1996, her sister Margaux died of a barbiturate overdose at age 42. She was the fifth to commit suicide in four generations of Hemingways, and her family had difficulty accepting the fact of her suicide.

In early 2011, Hemingway began a relationship with former stuntman Bobby Williams with whom she has co-authored a self-help book. She practices Transcendental Meditation.

In the 2013 television documentary Running from Crazy, Hemingway talked of her bouts of mental illness and her still lingering issues with her siblings. She spoke of her family's struggles with alcoholism, mental illnesses and suicide. In particular, she mentioned how her sister Margaux's suicide continued to haunt her. She also claimed that her parents' marriage was abusive and unhappy, and discussed abusive incidents in her childhood.

In her memoir, Out Came the Sun (2015), Hemingway discussed being hit on by older men in Hollywood, including Bob Fosse, Robert De Niro and Robert Towne. Woody Allen invited her on a trip to Paris, but she realized that he did not intend them to have separate rooms. Though she declined his advances, she states she continued to "love him as a friend" and was grateful that they stayed in touch in later years.

Filmography

Works

Explanatory notes

References

External links

 
 
 Mariel Hemingway.com – official website for Mariel's book Healthy Living

1961 births
20th-century American actresses
21st-century American actresses
Actresses from California
Actresses from Idaho
American child actresses
American film actresses
American memoirists
American television actresses
Boston University alumni
Hemingway family
Living people
Mental health activists
Nautilus Book Award winners
People from Ketchum, Idaho
People from Mill Valley, California
American women memoirists